Awadh Queer Pride is an annual event held in Lucknow, India. It was first held on 9 April 2017, and in the years since has also been held in February and March. It is organized by the Awadh Queer Pride Committee (AQPC), which is made up of volunteers.

History 
Awadh Queer Pride was inspired by the first ever Pride in India, Kolkata Pride, on 2 July 1999. 

The event began with a pride parade in 2017, which was organized by members of the city’s LGBTQIA+ community and led by Darvesh Singh Yadvendra. The parade was attended by approximately 300 people, including allies and parents of LGBTQIA+ individuals.

Approximately 400 people attended the second Awadh Queer Pride Walk in 2018.

In 2021, actresses Ridhi Dogra and Monica Dogra were invited to the event due to their work on the show The Married Woman.

References 

2017 establishments in Uttar Pradesh
Culture of Awadh
Pride parades in India
Recurring events established in 2017